Nanka (pronounced as Nan-ka by the natives), is an Igbo speaking town in Southeastern Nigeria. The town is bordered by Awka to the north, the town of Nanka is posited to exist alongside Igboukwu.

Location
Nanka is located in the Orumba North Local Government Area of Anambra State. Its geographic coordinates are 6" 03' 00 North, 7" 05' 00 East.
Its neighboring towns are Oko, Agulu, Ekwulobia, Aguluzigbo, Isuọfia, Umuọna, and Awgbu. Nanka comprises seven villages: Agbiligba, Enugwu, Ifite, Amako, Umudala, Ubahu, and Eti, in that order. Agbiligba is the head village in Nanka with three major kindreds (ebe n'ato); Oka, Umuduno and Umudim.

Facilities
The Nanka Post Office opened the early 20th century. Nanka has one main market, the Afor Market (formerly Afor-Udo) which trades on the Afor market day).

Nanka has two government secondary schools located in Agbiligba [ Community High School ] Nanka village and in Enugu [ Community Secondary School ] in Enugu village.  The Nwa-Agu Primary School is at Ifite village, the St.Micheal Primary school at Agbiligba village, the Nkwo-Agu Primary also at Agbiligba village, and the Enugwu Nanka Primary school.

In 1992, the Ofu-Obu Hospital opened in Nanka. Esso Exploration and Production Nigeria Limited (EEPPNL) later modernized and refurnished the facility. The hospital is presently run by the Anambra State government.  It is listed among the Nigerian Maternal and Child Health Care centres in collaboration with the Federal Government of Nigeria

On 26 May 2012, the NEROS Sports Stadium, founded by Chief Poly Ike Emenike, MON, Odenigbo, Nanka, opened in Nanka. 
On 23 July 2012, the Comprehensive Health Center opened in Nanka.

In November 2018 The Federal Road Safety Commission (FRSC) opened a new outpost (RS5.35a) at the Nkwoagu Junction of Nanka.

Town notables
The town has produced one time Vice Chancellor of the University of Nigeria, Nsukka, 
Two bishops;

Most Rev. Dr. Jonathan Onyemelukwe, the emeritus Archbishop of Province II, Anglican Communion.
Rt. Rev. Paulinus Ezeokafor, the present Bishop of Awka Roman Catholic Diocese. 
Chief Ebere Nwosu, CEO Greenlife Pharmaceuticals.
Chief Okwudili Ezenwankwo,(Ewepudike na Nanka), Honourable Member Federal House of Representatives representing Orumba North and South since May 2019.
(Sir) Anthony Gbuchie
Chief Polycarp Emenike (Odenigbo Nanka), MD/CEO Neros Pharmaceuticals, Neros Stadium.
Chief Jacob Enemuor (Enyi Nanka), MD/CEO Rocktama Water Plant Nanka.
Chief Damian Okeke (Ogene Nanka), Anambra State Chairman of Ohaneze ndí Igbo.
Michael Onyemelukwe, 2006 Ebonyi State winner and NAFT international representative of the annual OPEC French competition , Olympiad Physics finalist.
Prof. Cheluchi Onyemelukwe-Onuobia, Professor of Health Law; Winner of 2021 Nigeria Prize for Literature. 
Prof. Dora Akunyili (née Edemobi), former Director-General, NAFDAC; former Minister of Communications.

Nanka gully erosion
The Agulu-Nanka gully erosion has the potential for an ecological disaster, because the erosion causes frequent landslides. In the Nanka Community, Eke-Ntai in Amako Village, was reported to be a flourishing Slave Market during the period of the trafficking in human cargo and popularized by Ezenwenwe. The menacing erosion in Nanka today is said to have its origin in the notorious market.

A Soil Erosion Management Expert- Benneth Obele- in 2009 wrote that " erosion disaster in Nanka Ududo dates back to early 1920s when the gully sites were first observed near Eketai Market in Amako village as well as near Ududonka Shrine. The lucrative and hidden business in human trafficking or slave trade conducted within those two sites led to development of hidden bush foot pathways that were heavily flooded from neighbouring communities precipitating gully erosion"{Nanka Patriotic Union at 80[1], by Patrick Okeke Emezue}

On June 19, 2008, a landslide cut off Amako village from the rest of Nanka. In response, the Nanka Patriotic Union (NPU), social- set up measures for capacity building of inhabitants on application of control measures. Members of the Nanka community donated nearly 10,000 cashew seedlings for erosion control in the 20 erosion sites scattered in the town. The issue was discussed at the Oririji (New Yam) Festival on August 21 of 2010, where Igwe G.N Ofomata, Obu Nanka,{1991 to 2015} addressed the people. Igwe Joseph Nwankwo Ezenekwe was traditional ruler of Nanka from 1977–1982.

See also
Nigeria gully erosion crisis

References

Populated places in Anambra State